Algonquian–Basque pidgin, also known as Souriquois, was a Basque-based pidgin spoken by Basque whalers and various Algonquian peoples. It was spoken around the Gulf of Saint Lawrence. It was in use from at least 1580 until 1635, and was last attested in 1711.

There were three groups of First Nations that the Basque people distinguished. The ones with which they had good relations were the Montagnais and the St. Lawrence Iroquoians. They also knew of the Inuit, whom they considered hostile. The Basque people referred to them as the Montaneses, the Canaleses, and the Esquimoas, respectively.

Vocabulary

Sample phrases

See also
Basque–Icelandic pidgin

References

Further reading
 Koldo Mitxelena (1984): "Lingüística inmanente y lingüística trascendente", "Julio Urquijo" Euskal Filologiaren Seminoarioaren Urtekaria, 18, 251–266. orr, Donostia, Gipuzkoako Foru Aldundia.

Algonquian languages
Basque-based pidgins and creoles
Basque diaspora in North America
Extinct languages of North America
North America Native-based pidgins and creoles
Languages attested from the 16th century
16th-century establishments in North America
Languages extinct in the 18th century
18th-century disestablishments in North America